Rockvale High School is a public high school located in Rockvale, Tennessee near Murfreesboro in Rutherford County. It is located on State Route 99 (New Salem Highway) and opened in 2019. It is part of Rutherford County Schools. The $59 million contract for construction was signed in February 2017. It was named for the old Rockvale Community Consolidated School, which existed from 1927 to 1993, and the nickname is the Rockets, the mascot of the former school. As stated by the Tennessee State Report Card, the average ACT score was a 18.7, being worse than the state and district in every subject.

Athletics

In their inaugural season, the Rockvale Women's Swim Team were the 2019-2020 MTHSSA Division III-B Champions. In their second football season, Rockvale won their first football game over Franklin County High School in 2020.

References

External links
 Official Website

Public high schools in Tennessee
Schools in Rutherford County, Tennessee